17th Joseph Plateau Awards
May 7, 2004

Best Film: 
 The Memory of a Killer 
The 17th Joseph Plateau Awards, given on 7 May 2004, honored the best Belgian filmmaking of 2003.

Erik Van Looy's De Zaak Alzheimer (a.k.a. The Alzheimer Case or The Memory of a Killer) won five awards: Best Film, Actor (Decleir), Director (Van Looy), Screenplay and the Box Office Award. dEUS' singer Tom Barman's film Any Way the Wind Blows won two awards.

Winners
Best Actor: 
Jan Decleir - De Zaak Alzheimer
Best Actress: 
Natali Broods - Any Way the Wind Blows
Best Composer: 
Tom Barman - Any Way the Wind Blows 
Best Director: 
Erik Van Looy - De Zaak Alzheimer
Best Film: 
De Zaak Alzheimer
Best Screenplay: 
De Zaak Alzheimer - Carl Joos and Erik Van Looy
Best Short Film: 
Mayra
Box office award: 
De Zaak Alzheimer

2003 film awards
Belgian film awards